Laurie Jeanette Rushing (born September 10, 1968) is a real estate broker from Hot Springs, Arkansas, who is a Republican member of the Arkansas House of Representatives for District 26, which includes Garland and Hot Spring counties.

In the 2014 general election, Rushing narrowly unseated the Democratic incumbent David Kizzia, 4,369 (51.4 percent) to 4,126 (48.6 percent).
 She
serves on the House committees of (1) Judiciary Committee, (2), Aging, Children and Youth, Legislative and Military Affairs, (3) Select committee for Rules, and (4) the Legislative Joint Auditing.

Rushing is heavily involved in various activities of the National Association of Realtors. She is a member of the Baptist Church. She graduated from Fountain Lake High School in Hot Springs. She has a son, Kevin Rushing of Little Rock. She formerly lived in Fayetteville, Arkansas.

In 2002, Rushing and her mother, Lorna Jean Nobles, opened Trademark Real Estate in Hot Springs.

References

1968 births
Living people
Fountain Lake High School alumni
University of Arkansas alumni
Republican Party members of the Arkansas House of Representatives
Women state legislators in Arkansas
American real estate businesspeople
Businesspeople from Arkansas
Politicians from Hot Springs, Arkansas
Baptists from Arkansas
21st-century American politicians
21st-century American women politicians